Formentera is the smallest and most southerly island of the Pityusic Islands group (comprising Ibiza and Formentera, as well as various small islets), which belongs to the Balearic Islands autonomous community (Spain).

History 
The island's name is usually said to derive from the Latin word frumentarium, meaning "granary". The island was occupied in prehistoric times, going back to 2,000–1,600 BC. Archaeological sites from that period remain in Ca na Costa, Cap de Barbaria (multiple sites) and Cova des Fum. The island had been occupied by the Carthaginians before passing to the ancient Romans.  In succeeding centuries, it passed to the Visigoths, the Byzantines, the Vandals, and the Arabs. In 1109 it was the target of a devastating attack by the Norwegian king Sigurd I at the head of the "Norwegian Crusade". The island was conquered by the James I the Conqueror, added to the Crown of Aragon and later became part of the medieval Kingdom of Majorca.

From 1403 to the early 18th century, the threat of Barbary pirate attacks rendered the island uninhabitable. On 17 June 1651, during the Franco-Spanish War (1635-1659), a squadron of Spanish galleys under John of Austria the Younger captured the French galleon Lion Couronné off this island.

The island (along with its surrounding islets) became a separate insular council (with the same territory as the municipality of the same name) after 1977. Before that, it was administered in the former insular council of Ibiza and Formentera (covering the whole group of the Pityusic Islands), but in a separate comarca (which already covered the current municipality of Formentera). This reform allowed Ibiza to unify its comarca (of five municipalities) with its new insular council (no longer administrating Formentera).

Geography 

More specifically Formentera is part of the delimitation of the Balearic Sea which is a northwestern element of the Mediterranean Sea. Its major villages are Sant Francesc Xavier, Sant Ferran de ses Roques, El Pilar de la Mola (on the La Mola peninsula) and La Savina.

Formentera comprises one municipality, also called Formentera, and has a population of 9,962 (as at 1 January 2010). It is subdivided into several civil parishes (parròquies), themselves subdivided into vendas (véndes in Catalan).

North of Formentera is the island of Espalmador (Illa de s'Empalmador in Catalan), which is the second largest island of the municipality, and is itself surrounded by a few minor islets. Espalmador is a tombolo, separated from the main island of Formentera by a shallow sandbar, and during low tide, it is possible for one to wade between the two islands.  This area is a popular stopping point for those in yachts heading between Ibiza and Formentera.

Climate

Formentera has a semi-arid climate with hot, very dry summers and warm, dry winters.

Attractions 
Since the 1960s, Formentera has been a popular destination for hippies. Formentera is renowned across Europe for many pristine white beaches and the fact that nude sunbathing is allowed on most of its beaches. The Canadian writer Patrick Roscoe was born in Formentera. Meanwhile, Joni Mitchell wrote her 1971 album Blue on the island while Bob Dylan once lived in the Cap de Barbaria lighthouse on the island. Author Matt Haig also writes about visiting the island often in his twenties in Reasons to Stay Alive.  The opening track of the King Crimson album Islands, Formentera Lady, is named after the island. James Taylor also worked on his hit song Carolina in My Mind on holiday from recording with Apple Records, though he began writing it in London and completed it on the nearby island of Ibiza.

Although paved roads allow access to all parts of the island and cars are easily hired in the port, many people choose to rent mopeds or even bicycles due to the flat nature of most of the island and the availability of dedicated cycle tracks in many locations.

The island also has four Martello towers.

Transport 
With no airports, the island was formerly reachable only by boat from Ibiza, making it the quieter of the two islands, but in recent years regular passenger service from the Spanish mainland has increased tourism.

Ferry tickets from Ibiza are available in advance, as are transfers from Ibiza airport or port directly to accommodation in Formentera.

Ferries to Formentera operate from their own terminal in Ibiza port, with departures every half hour in high season on large (200+ passenger) fast catamarans. The journey takes approximately 30 minutes comprising 10 minutes leaving Ibiza, 10 minutes crossing the sea, and 10 minutes arriving in Formentera past the isthmus to Espalmador.

Some of the anchorages may not be ideal for sailboats under less than ideal circumstances.

Culture 
A local Ibizan (eivissenc) variant of the Balearic dialect of the Catalan language is spoken in Formentera. While the official languages are Catalan and Spanish, other major languages like English, Italian, German, French and Dutch can also be heard extensively in the summer due to mass tourism.

Sports 
From 1 September to 7 September, Formentera hosted the 2007 Techno 293 OD World Championships in windsurfing for juniors under 15 and youths under 17.

Villages 
 

Es Mal Pas

Gallery

References

External links 

 Consell de Formentera
 Local government website
 

 
Comarcas of the Balearic Islands
Islands of the Balearic Islands
Municipalities in the Balearic Islands
Nude beaches
Mediterranean islands